Bayview is an unincorporated community in Northampton County, Virginia, United States.

History
Bayview is an over-300-year-old predominantly African American community located on the Eastern Shore of Virginia. After the American Civil War, it became a community populated by freed slaves, principally consisting of farms and a small village with shops, restaurants, and its own post office. In the 20th century, Bayview thrived due to agriculture, especially the growing of white potatoes and the growth of the local seafood industry. In the late 20th century, Bayview was hit hard when many of the canneries and seafood processing plants closed due to dwindling shellfish populations in the Chesapeake Bay as a result of increased pollution.

In 1994, the state of Virginia proposed to build a maximum-security prison on the edge of the community. At this time, 90% of Bayview residents lived in substandard housing, with 85% having no indoor plumbing. Members of the community rallied and joined together with outside forces, ultimately defeating the prison in the spring of 1995. 

In 1998, the community organized the Bayview Citizens for Social Justice and began forming productive partnerships, including the Nature Conservancy, to improve the standard of living for its people. Through a combination of federal, state, and private funds, the community was able to raise $11 million and purchase 160 acres of farmland, including the proposed site for the prison. In the first phase, they built 48 one, two, and three-bedroom apartments, 22 single-family homes, a laundry facility, a Community Enrichment Center, and several other facilities. Currently, the Bayview community is on the rise and is working towards the next phase of development.

Demographics

Bayview is composed of approximately 200 people, 125 of which are over the age of 18. The community is predominantly African American, but in recent years there has been an increasing number of White and Hispanic people.

No male has graduated or even attended college and only 7 out of 125 adults have earned a college degree.  Less than half (49.6%) have received a high school degree.

Yearly income for a Bayview family ranges from under $10,000 to $40,000.  83% of the population makes less than $10,000 a year, which is below the United States' poverty line. As of September 1, 2012, no individual makes over $40,000 per year.

Bayview Citizens for Social Justice

Overview

Mission & Background
Bayview Citizens for Social Justice, Inc. (BCSJ) is a 501(c)(3) organization whose mission is to eliminate poverty by improving the living conditions of its citizens and to properly educate, unite, and empower the residents of Bayview, Va. BCSJ was formed in 1998 after the successful protest against the proposed construction of a maximum-security prison.

Community Activities
The community works to bring together citizens for cultural and religious celebrations such as Black History Month, Easter, and Christmas. BCSJ also works to improve the living qualities and improve the self-sufficiency of Bayview's citizens.

Duties
The BCSJ received a capacity building grant from a National Housing Assistance Council (HAC) which has produced and extended board training in Financial Management and Loan Packaging. The management and maintenance of this grant is used on programs such as BCSJ Water and Sewer Program, Lease-to-Purchase HOME Program and the Shared Properties, Developed Lots, Street Lights, Storm-water retention pond and Community Farm program.

Strengths, Improvements, and Opportunities
Each year, a private firm is hired to conduct a SWOT survey for BCSJ. A strength outlined in particular was Bayview's outstanding land control, with 150 acres of buildable lots and community farmland. BCSJ has worked to develop a Master Plan for new housing, childcare, and a community center and currently owns community buildings for public meetings, workshops, and gatherings. Members in the community demonstrate the powers of Productive Partnerships, Coalitions, and Networking. Previous and current partnerships include NAACP, the Nature Conservancy, the United States Department of Housing and Urban Development (HUD), Old Dominion University, and the Citizens for a Better Eastern Shore.  With the help of community leaders who persevere with strong resilience, extensive work has been done to garner media attention, exposure and support. Yet, the community struggles with a lack of professional skills, including financial management, property management, asset management and a lack of supportive legal advisors.

Close to Bayview is a tourist attraction area with camping, golfing, bird-watching, fishing, retirement living, etc. The location brings difficulty, as a peninsular toll bridge to the metropolitan mainland and Virginia Beach is difficult to pay for the many low-to-moderate income families living in Bayview. The separation between the affluent beach community and Bayview also provides a stigma and segregation, as predominantly African American, low income families are just two miles from gated waterfront communities, leading to gentrification.

Notable people

Alice Coles – Alice Coles is the executive director of BCSJ. Her leadership led to Bayview's positive redevelopment into a strong community of people with a lifetime commitment to better living.  She is a descendant of freed slaves. One of her initial leadership experiences was running Bayview's black chapel. In 1994, the state of Virginia planned a maximum-security prison less than a mile from the neighborhood school. With only a high school education and with a job handpicking meat out of crabs, Coles decided to educate herself about the Department of Corrections and travel to Richmond, VA to fight against the proposal. Coles was able to defeat the proposal for the prison. For the next 14 years, Coles organized a national media campaign to advance her community and called on the National Association for the Advancement of Colored People (NAACP) and the Nature Conservancy.  BCSJ raised over 11 million dollars to purchase the prison site (104 acres) and 54 additional acres and built a new village of mixed housing and infrastructure.  This construction gave many Bayview citizens new amenities.

In the News

Alice Coles and Bayview have been featured on 60 Minutes, NPR, Voice of America, and in a VCU documentary called “This Black Soil.”   Alice was commended by the Virginia State legislature in 2006 and was a 2005 winner of the Impact Award, known now as the Inspire Awards.

References

Unincorporated communities in Virginia
Unincorporated communities in Northampton County, Virginia
Virginia populated places on the Chesapeake Bay